Dover Island, the third largest island in the Kent Group, is a densely vegetated and unpopulated  granite island with steep slopes, located in the Bass Strait, lying off the north-east coast of Tasmania, between the Furneaux Group and Wilsons Promontory in Victoria, Australia.

The island is part of the Kent Group National Park, Tasmania's northernmost national park, which was gazetted in 2002.  Unlike its companion islands, Deal and Erith, Dover has never been grazed by stock or cleared, so retaining its original cover of native vegetation and almost completely lacking exotic species.

Flora and fauna
Dover is covered by low forest dominated by Drooping Sheoak (Allocasuarina verticillata).  Recorded breeding seabird and wader species include little penguin, Pacific gull, and sooty oystercatcher.

See also

 List of islands of Tasmania

References

External links
 

Islands of Northern Tasmania
Protected areas of Tasmania
Bass Strait